John David Brcin  (born Jovan Brčin; August 15, 1899 - October 31, 1983) was an American sculptor and artist.

Background and education 
Brcin was born into a Serb family in Gračac, then part of the Austro-Hungarian Empire (modern-day Croatia), to parents David and Milica Kesić Brčin as Jovan Brčin. His father died when he was two years old. After his father's death, Brcin was brought up by an uncle who was a carpenter and mason. As a child, Brcin helped him carve simple wooden objects during the winter months. He immigrated to the United States in 1913 to join an older brother who was working at a bank in Gary, Indiana.

In 1917, Brcin studied sculpture at Chicago's Art Institute, where he received a fellowship allowing him to pursue his studies for one year in Serbia, France and Italy. He obtained a Bachelor of Fine Arts from The Art Institute of Chicago and a Master of Arts from Ohio State University. Brcin became a member of the National Sculpture Society in 1935.

He married Blanche Elizabeth Moore in 1923  and died in 1983 in Boulder, Colorado.

Career 
Brcin's style relied on traditional portraiture and streamlined designs, as well as sharply cut geometric details done in bas-relief. He received various public commissions throughout the United States and also taught at several art schools.

In 1929, Brcin became the official sculptor during the construction of the Joslyn Art Museum in Omaha, Nebraska. He carved the building's pink marble exterior panels, featuring figures of Native Americans and European settlers. He also sculpted the memorial tablet to George Joslyn, various column and pilaster capitals, and the rosette designs of several entrances. According to the Chicago Herald-Examiner, "Brcin’s carvings are a new thing; they are full of dynamic thrust, a smooth sharp-edged symmetry which admirably interprets the spirit of an age governed by machinery." Brcin also designed the museum's "Sioux Warrior" statue which was only completed in 2009 using his original plaster prototype.

In 1948, Brcin produced the Governor Horner State Memorial, a granite monument located in Chicago, Illinois. The outdoor sculpture illustrates the career of Henry Horner, the 30th governor of Illinois. Originally erected in Grant Park, the memorial can now be found in Horner Park.

In addition to commission work, Brcin was hired in 1922 to teach modeling and drawing at the Minneapolis School of Art. From 1923 to 1924, he headed the sculpture department at Milwaukee's Layton School of Art. He later taught modeling at Rockford College for two years starting in 1934.

Portfolio 
 Bust of Nikola Tesla.
 Bust of Bishop Nikolaj Velimirović.
 Head of Mark Twain (owned by the City of Chicago)
 Bust of Mark Twain for North Central College, Naperville, Illinois
 Caroline (owned by Witte Museum in San Antonio)
 Portrait bust of Judge Elbert H. Gary for the Commercial Club, Gary, Indiana 
 Memorial tablet to Newton, Mann, 1st Unitarian Church of Omaha
 Rudulph Hering Medal for the American Society of Civil Engineers
 Memorial tablet to Benjamin Franklin Lounsbury, Washington Boulevard Hospital, Chicago
 Monument to Cyrus Hall McCormick, Washington and Lee University, Lexington, Virginia
 Stephen Decatur Monument, Decatur, Illinois
 Heroic portrait bust of Stephen Decatur for the United States Naval Academy, Annapolis

Awards 
 Bryant Lathrop traveling scholarship, The Art Institute of Chicago, 1920
 Certificate of merit, The Art Institute of Chicago, 1922
 Mistress John C. Shaffer prize, 1923
 William Mont Rose French memorial gold medal, The Art Institute of Chicago, 1926
 Catherine Barker Spaulding prize, Hoosier Salon, 1936
 Hickox prize, Museum of Fine Arts in Houston, 1936
 Municipal Art League portrait prize, 1945

Exhibitions 
During the 1920s, Brcin participated in several group exhibitions, as well as having a one-man show in Chicago which subsequently. traveled to the Brooks Memorial Gallery in Memphis, the Art Institute of Omaha, the Museum of Fine Arts in Houston, and the Witte Museum in San Antonio.

He later exhibited at New York's National Academy of Design, the Pennsylvania Academy of the Fine Arts, The Art Institute of Chicago, the Detroit Institute of Arts, The Museum of Fine Arts, Houston (MFAH), the Legion of Honor (museum), the Brooklyn Museum, the Albright–Knox Art Gallery in Buffalo, and the Milwaukee Institute of Art & Design.

His work is represented in permanent collections at the University of Illinois, Roosevelt University, and the Evansville Museum of Arts, History and Science located in Indiana.

References

External links 
 https://www.jstor.org/stable/23930590
 http://www.medalartists.com/brcin-john-david.html

20th-century American sculptors
20th-century American male artists
American people of Serbian descent
Austro-Hungarian emigrants to the United States
American architectural sculptors
1899 births
1983 deaths